In military terms, 136th Division or 136th Infantry Division may refer to:

 136th Division (Imperial Japanese Army)
 Italian 136th Armoured Division
 Italian 136th Infantry Division
 136th Rifle Division (Soviet Union)